Werben (Elbe) is a town in the district of Stendal, in Saxony-Anhalt, Germany.

Geography
It is situated on the left bank of the Elbe River, approximately seven kilometres west of Havelberg. It is part of the Verbandsgemeinde ("collective municipality") Arneburg-Goldbeck. The town's official name is Hansestadt Werben (Elbe), referring to its status as a former member of the Hanseatic League.

History
Werben was first documented in 1005 and placed an influential role during the medieval wars between the Saxons and Polabian Slavs; its name is of Slavic origin. Part of the Altmark, it received town rights in 1151 from Albert the Bear and received an influx of Hollanders in 1160. It became a participant of the Hanseatic League in 1358. While part of the Margraviate of Brandenburg, Werben was the scene of the 1631 Battle of Werben during the Thirty Years' War. Werben became part of the Kingdom of Prussia in 1701. It became part of the Prussian Province of Saxony in 1815 after the Napoleonic Wars and the new state of Saxony-Anhalt after World War II. In January 2010 it absorbed the former municipality Behrendorf.

Werben's architecture is reminiscent of the Biedermeier style (Biedermeierstadt). Twice a year, the "Biedermeiermarkt" is held, a weekend festival in remembrance of this period.

Personalities

Sons and daughters of the city 

 Friedrich Reindel (1824-1908), Scharfrichter

People who are connected to the city 

 Markgraf Albrecht the Bear (c. 1100-1170), issued the first charter as a margrave of Brandenburg in Werder in 1157, and donated the income of the Werbener Kirche and Grundbesitz to the Johanniterhospital at Jerusalem in 1160. 
 Gottfried Arnold (Germanic theologian, 1666-1714) was pastor from 1704 to 1707 in advertisements
 Friedrich Schorlemmer (born 1944), evangelical theologian, grew up in advertising and lives in Werben (as of 2012)

References

External links

Towns in Saxony-Anhalt
Stendal (district)
Members of the Hanseatic League